D107 is a state road branching off from D106 trunk road on the island of Pag and terminating in Stara Novalja ferry port. The road is 8.0 km long.

The road, as well as all other state roads in Croatia, is managed and maintained by Hrvatske ceste, a state-owned company.

Road junctions and populated areas

Sources

State roads in Croatia
Lika-Senj County
Pag (island)